East Matunuck State Beach is a public recreation area encompassing  on the shore of Block Island Sound in the town of South Kingstown, Rhode Island. The state beach offers picnicking, ocean swimming, and beach activities. It is open seasonally.

History
The state began securing the area through condemnation proceedings beginning in 1956. An additional  parcel was purchased in 1967. A beach pavilion featuring concessions, bathrooms, changing stalls, and a lifeguard tower was built at a cost of $4.5 million and opened in May 2012.

References

External links
East Matunuck State Beach Rhode Island Department of Environmental Management Division of Parks & Recreation

State parks of Rhode Island
Beaches of Rhode Island
Protected areas of Washington County, Rhode Island
Protected areas established in 1956
1956 establishments in Rhode Island
Beaches of Washington County, Rhode Island